Fourmetot is a former commune in the Eure department in the Normandy region in northern France. On 1 January 2019, it was merged into the new commune Le Perrey.

Population

See also
Communes of the Eure department

References

External links

 Site de la Commune de Fourmetot

Former communes of Eure